The following is a list of awards and nominations received by Kevin Spacey, an American actor. Over his decade-spanning career, Spacey has won two Academy Awards, a Tony Award and a Golden Globe Award. He was nominated for a Grammy Award as well as twelve Primetime Emmy Awards. Spacey received a star on the Hollywood Walk of Fame in 1999, and was named an honorary Commander and Knight Commander of the Order of the British Empire in 2010 and 2015, respectively.

Major associations

Academy Awards

Emmy Awards

Grammy Awards

Tony Awards

BAFTA Awards

Industry awards

Critics' Choice Awards

Golden Globe Awards

Screen Actors Guild Award

Laurence Olivier Award

Miscellaneous awards

Drama Desk Award

MTV Movie & TV Awards

Outer Critics Circle Award

People's Choice Awards

Saturn Awards

Critics associations

Other accolades

Appointments

In 1999, Spacey received a star on Hollywood Walk of Fame.

Spacey was awarded an honorary Doctor of Letters (Hon.Litt.D.) from the London South Bank University in November 2005.

In June 2008, he was appointed as Cameron Mackintosh Visiting Professor of Contemporary Theatre at St Catherine's College, Oxford, succeeding Patrick Stewart in the post. He was officially welcomed on October 13, 2008.

At the 2014 National Academy of Video Game Trade Reviewers (NAVGTR) awards Spacey won the Performance in a Drama, Lead for his performance in Call of Duty: Advanced Warfare.

In 2015, Spacey was awarded an honorary knighthood for his services to culture and British theater after finishing a 10-year run as artistic director at London's Old Vic theater.

On April 12, 2015, he received a Special Olivier Award recognising his contribution to British theatre during his eleven-year tenure as Artistic Director of The Old Vic.

The International Academy of Television Arts and Sciences decided that due to the sexual allegations brought up by Anthony Rapp, it would reverse its decision to honor Spacey with the 2017 International Emmy Founders Award.

References

Spacey
Awards